Pratury Trirumala Rao (died 1997) was an Indian pediatrician and a writer of medical and non-fiction literature. He was a professor of pediatrics at the Gandhi Medical College, Hyderabad. He was the author of two books on pediatric medicine in English, The insulin requirements of children with diabetes mellitus maintained in good control and Pediatric Problems in Developing Countries), two books in Telugu Gāndhījītō paricayaṃ and Gadacina Rojulu) and two biographical accounts (Living as a Doctor, published by Bharatiya Vidya Bhavan) and (Glimpses of American Life, published by the Cultural Renaissance Society of India). The Government of India awarded him the third highest civilian honour of the Padma Bhushan, in 1988, for his contributions to medical science. He died in 1997, survived by his daughter, Lakshmi Pratury, a US-based social worker. A yoga institute in Hyderabad, Padma Bushan DRP Tirumala Rao Institute of Yoga is named after him.

Bibliography

See also 
 Gandhi Medical College

References 

Recipients of the Padma Bhushan in medicine
1997 deaths
Year of birth missing
Indian paediatricians
20th-century Indian non-fiction writers
Telugu writers
Indian medical writers
Academic staff of Osmania University
Writers from Andhra Pradesh
Indian male writers
20th-century Indian medical doctors
Scientists from Andhra Pradesh